The Standard is an album by The Super Jazz Trio: pianist Tommy Flanagan, bassist Reggie Workman and drummer Joe Chambers.

Background
The Super Jazz Trio was formed in 1978 by pianist Tommy Flanagan, bassist Reggie Workman and drummer Joe Chambers.

Music and recording
The album was recorded at The Power Station in New York City on February 14, 1980.

Releases
The Standard was released by the Japanese label Baystate. It was The Super Jazz Trio's final recording.

Track listing
"Softly, as in a Morning Sunrise" (Oscar Hammerstein II, Sigmund Romberg)6:18
"Night in Tunisia" (Dizzy Gillespie, Frank Paparelli)6:16
"Someday My Prince Will Come" (Frank Churchill, Larry Morey)8:04
"Autumn Leaves" (Joseph Kosma, Johnny Mercer, Jacques Prévert)8:31
"It's All Right with Me" (Cole Porter)3:26
"Angel Eyes" (Earl Brent, Matt Dennis)6:11
"Straight, No Chaser" (Thelonious Monk)2:35

Personnel
Tommy Flanagan – piano
Reggie Workman – bass
Joe Chambers – drums

References

1980 albums
Tommy Flanagan albums